"Attention" is a song by American hip hop artist Fat Joe, in collaboration with American singer Chris Brown and American rapper Dre. It was released as a digital download on July 23, 2018 as the third stand-alone single from the duo made of Fat Joe and Dre. The song was produced by Scott Storch.

Background 
Joe and Brown previously tag-teamed on their 2011 single "Another Round", that was certified gold by RIAA. According to Fat Joe, collaborate with Brown for "Another Round" in the studio was simply a no-brainer. Joe told Billboard that it is "always an honor" to walk with Brown, whom he called "a beautiful talent. Me and Dre said we need Chris on here [and] it would be fire".

"Attention" was supposed to be the lead single of Joe and Dre's collaborative project, however it ended up not being on it.

Composition and lyrics 
The song was written by Fat Joe, Chris Brown and Dre, and was produced by Scott Storch. Musically "Attention" is a midtempo song that runs for four minutes and one second. In the song Fat joe raps about Joe raps at length about women vying for a second chance after things have gone sour. "Ever since I put that ass in detention/You were showing ass on the crack for attention," Joe raps. Brown then delivers a hook directed at his female opportunists. "Now, you're calling me for attention, fiending for attention/say you're looking for that action, get my name all in your mentions/Oh, now you're coming to your senses," Brown croons.

Music video
On August 6, 2018, Fat Joe announced that they shot the video that day, and later on September 4, 2018, he released the music video for "Attention", directed by Eif Rivera, on his YouTube and Vevo account. The video was shot in Los Angeles. Ashanti made a cameo appearance.

Charts

References 

2018 singles
2018 songs
Fat Joe songs
Chris Brown songs
Songs written by Chris Brown
Songs written by Fat Joe
Songs written by Dre (record producer)